Kasat Suek refers to an intersection and its corresponding bridge on the periphery of Pom Prap Sattru Phai and Pathum Wan Districts, Bangkok. The intersection is also known by the names Bobae Intersection and Yotse Intersection.

Characteristics and history
Kasat Suek Intersection is a four-way intersection between Rama I, Krung Kasem, and Bamrung Mueang Roads, considered to be the end of Bamrung Mueang and the beginning of Rama I. It takes its name from Kasat Suek Bridge, which is on Rama I Road next to the intersection. 

Kasat Suek Bridge is composed of two sections, one across the railway from the nearby Bangkok railway station and the other across from Khlong Phadung Krung Kasem (Phadung Krung Kasem Canal) towards the intersection. Formerly a wooden bridge called "Yotse", (a name that remains more popular than "Kasat Suek" and is still used unofficially today for both the bridge and the general surrounding area). In 1928, during the reign of King Prajadhipok (Rama VII), the deteriorated wooden bridge was rebuilt as a reinforced concrete bridge, with the name being officially changed to Kasat Suek. The king presided over the opening ceremony on 6 April 1929. The bridge was also the first overpass in Thailand.

"Kasat Suek" translates as 'king of war' and comes from the title Somdet Chaophraya Maha Kasatsuek (สมเด็จเจ้าพระยามหากษัตริย์ศึก), which belonged to King Phutthayotfa Chulalok (Rama I), founder of the Chakri dynasty and namesake of the road the bridge is on, before he became king.  It is believed that he had passed through this area while returning from battle.

In the past, the intersection was known as the site of a movie theater named "Chaloem Khet" (เฉลิมเขตร์) after Princess Chalermkhetramongmol, Prince Bhanurangsi Savangwongse's youngest daughter. The theater was later demolished, though the name still exists with the alleys in this area being called Soi Chaloem Khet.

The route was not successful, as the vehicle used was a horse-drawn carriage.

Nearby places
Debsirin School
Bobae Market
Hua Chiew Hospital
Hua Lamphong railway station & State Railway of Thailand (SRT)
Department of Alternative Energy Development and Efficiency & Ban Phibuntham

References 

Road junctions in Bangkok
Pom Prap Sattru Phai district
Pathum Wan district
Bridges in Bangkok
Neighbourhoods of Bangkok